Colin Hunt was a British basketball player. He competed in the men's tournament at the 1948 Summer Olympics.

References

External links
 

Year of birth missing
Possibly living people
British men's basketball players
Olympic basketball players of Great Britain
Basketball players at the 1948 Summer Olympics
Place of birth missing